Conemaugh Valley School District is a school district in Cambria County, Pennsylvania, United States.

Extracurriculars
The Conemaugh Valley School District offers a wide variety of clubs, activities and an extensive, publicly funded sports program.

Athletics
The school district offers:
Varsity

Boys
Baseball - A
Basketball- A
Football - A
Golf - AA

Girls
Basketball - A
Golf - AA
Softball - A
Swimming and Diving - AAA
Volleyball - A

Junior High Middle School Sports

Boys
Baseball
Basketball
Football
Golf

Girls
Basketball
Golf
Softball 
Volleyball

According to PIAA directory July 2014

References

School districts in Cambria County, Pennsylvania